Arooj Aftab (born March 11, 1985) is a Grammy-award winning singer, composer, and producer based in the United States. She works in various musical styles and idioms, including jazz, minimalism, and neo-Sufi.

Aftab was nominated for the Best New Artist award and won the Best Global Music Performance award for her song "Mohabbat" at the 64th Annual Grammy Awards in April 2022. She became the first-ever Pakistani artist to win a Grammy Award.

On the 75th diamond jubilee anniversary of Pakistan, President Arif Alvi awarded to Aftab, the Pride of Performance Award, the highest literary award for showing excellence in the field of art and music.

Early life and education 
Aftab was born to Pakistani parents expatriated in Saudi Arabia. When she was about 10 years old, they returned to their native Lahore, Pakistan. She learned to play the guitar in autodidact and gradually acquired her singing style while listening to Billie Holiday, Hariprasad Chaurasia, Mariah Carey, and Begum Akhtar. At that time, Aftab lived in a country where access to Western online platforms was difficult, and the infrastructure for independent music was lacking. In this context, however, she promoted her music in Pakistan, being one of the first musicians to use the Internet in the early 2000s; her renditions of "Mera Pyaar" and "Hallelujah" went viral and launched the Pakistani indie scene.

Aftab moved to the United States at the age of 19 in 2005 and earned a degree in music production and engineering at Boston's Berklee College of Music. She moved to New York in 2010 and began working as an editor and scoring films. Since her graduation, Aftab has lived there, being part of the city's jazz and "new music" scene.

Career 
In April 2011, Aftab was included in the "100 Composers Under 40" selection launched by NPR and WQXR-FM's Q2 (a contemporary classical music internet radio station).

Aftab's first album, Bird Under Water, was released independently in 2014. It received critical acclaim from David Honigmann of the Financial Times, who gave the album four out of five stars in March 2015.

She worked as an editor on the documentary Armed With Faith (2017), winning a 2018 Emmy Award afterward.

Her second album, Siren Islands, was released on June 12, 2018, through New Amsterdam Records. NPR included the album in their "Favorite Electronic and Dance Music of 2018" list. The New York Times listed the song "Island No. 2", which represented the album, in their "25 Best Classical Music Tracks of 2018" list. In mid-July 2018, the song "Lullaby", taken from Bird Under Water, was ranked number 150 on the NPR's "200 Greatest Songs By 21st Century Women" list.

In 2020, Aftab sang, among other vocalists, on Residente's Latin Grammy Award-winning single "Antes Que El Mundo Se Acabe". That year, she composed the music for the Student Academy Award-winning film Bittu (narrative category) by Karishma Dube.

An anticipated release, Aftab's third studio album, Vulture Prince, was released on April 23, 2021, via New Amsterdam Records. Thematically, the album discusses stories of people, relationships, and lost moments and is dedicated to the memory of her younger brother, Maher. Vulture Prince received praise from publications such as Pitchfork, NPR, and the Al Jazeera English-language news channel. Barack Obama selected the song "Mohabbat" from this album as one of his summer playlist favorites for 2021. "Mohabbat" was called one of the best songs of 2021 by Time and The New York Times. Vulture Prince was named the best album of 2021 by Netherlands newspaper de Volkskrant, topping their year-end list. Brenna Ehrlich ranked the album sixth on Rolling Stones "Best Music of 2021" staff list. It was ranked number twenty by The Guardian on their list of the "50 best albums of 2021", and Laura Snapes named Aftab "[t]he year's biggest musical revelation". While Vulture Prince did not rank on the Los Angeles Times top ten "Best Albums of 2021", it was, however, included on their "15 deserving albums" list. In late 2021, Aftab signed with Verve Records.

Arooj Aftab became first Pakistani artist to perform at Grammys.

Performances 
Aftab has performed her music at notable music venues such as the Barbican, the Chan Centre, the Lincoln Center, the Andy Warhol Museum, Haus der Kulturen der Welt, The Kitchen, (Le) Poisson Rouge, and the Museum of Modern Art.

She has also performed at international music festivals such as Coachella, Glastonbury, Primavera Sound Barcelona, Roskilde Festival,  Big Ears Festival, The Ecstatic Music Festival, the San Francisco Jazz Festival, Montreal Jazz Festival, Pitchfork Music Festival and the  Newport Folk Festival. In 2018 she opened for Mitski at The Brooklyn Steel.

In September 2022, Aftab will perform at the Metropolitan Museum of Art's Temple of Dandur, and at The Broad's 2022 Summer Happenings series.

Musical style and influences
Aftab's music has been described as a blend of jazz fusion, jazz, electronica, neo-Sufi, folk, Hindustani classical,  classical music, indie pop, minimalism, and acoustic music. Aftab told the Los Angeles Times that she had aspired that Vulture Prince would "transcend boundaries".

She has mentioned Abbey Lincoln, Abida Parveen, Anoushka Shankar, Begum Akhtar, Esperanza Spalding, Jeff Buckley, Julius Eastman, Meshell Ndegeocello, Morton Feldman, and Terry Riley as her influences. Aftab also expressed her admiration for Billie Eilish. Lyrically, Aftab has cited Asian poets as influences such as Rumi, Mirza Ghalib, and Hafeez Hoshiarpuri and uses Urdu Ghazal. Her vocals have been described as "meditative". Vulture Prince revolves around themes of grief and longing.

Personal life
In an interview with Pitchfork, Aftab hinted at being queer.

Discography

Albums
 Bird Under Water (2014, self-released)
 Siren Islands (2018, New Amsterdam Records)
 Vulture Prince (2021, New Amsterdam Records)

Other works 
 Music director for the film Without Shepherds by Cary McClelland (2013)
 Composed and sang on the album The Julius Eastman Memory Depot by Jace Clayton (2013)
Sang the title song Insaaf for the film Talvar, written by Gulzar and composed by Vishal Bhardwaj (2015)
 Sang an old traditional Bandish of Raag Bhairavi Raske Bhare Tore Nain for the film Dobara Phir Se by Mehreen Jabbar (2016)
 Composed and sang the song De Libbe with Daso for Tale and Tone Records (2017)
 Featured singer on Climbing Poetree's album Intrinsic (2017)
 Composer, Sound Designer and Implementer for Backbone by Eggnut Games (2021)
 Sang Mehram with Asfar Hussain for Coke Studio (2022)

Personnel 
Current backing members
 Darian Donovan Thomas – violin
 Gyan Riley – guitar
 Maeve Gilchrist – harp
 Shahzad Ismaily – bass, synthesizer

Awards and nominations

References

External links 
 
 
 "Pakistani musician Arooj Aftab's 'neo-Sufi' music blends Rumi with reggae and more", PBS NewsHour,  October 4, 2021

1985 births
Living people
21st-century Pakistani women singers
American musicians of Pakistani descent
Musicians from Lahore
Pakistani emigrants to the United States
Berklee College of Music alumni
People from Riyadh
Recipients of the Pride of Performance
Pakistani expatriates in Saudi Arabia